Aryabhatta International School (AIS) came into existence in the year 2012 under the aegis of Aryabhatta Educational and Charitable Society. The school is affiliated to Central Board of Secondary Education (CBSE), New Delhi and offers education up to Senior Secondary classes.

Teaching methodology 

The institute follows Continuous and Comprehensive Evaluation (CCE) system of education which is initiated by CBSE Board, New Delhi.

School facilities 

The school facilities include:
 Library
 Computer Lab
 First Aid Facility
 Transportation
 Sports
 Water & Power

Extracurricular activities 

The students are given training in following subjects:

Sports & outdoor Activities:
 Yoga
 Aerobics
 Badminton
 Gymnastics
 Carrom
 Chess
 Table Tennis
 Gardening
 Environment Club
 Excursions
 Lawn Tennis
 Martial Arts
 Table Soccer

Indoor Activities:
 Quiz
 Debate
 Declamation
 Soft Skill Training
 Project related activities
 Extempore Speech
 Story Telling
 Group Discussions
 Recitation

Creative Activities:
 Dance – Indian Classical, Folk and Western
 Dramatics – Hindi and English
 Music
 Clay Modeling

Our Facility Include:
 Air-Conditioned Environment
 Safe and Comfortable Transportation Facility
 Setting Zone

Events & Celebrations:
 Annual Day
 Sports Day
 Festivals
 Grand Parent's Day
 Independence Day
 Environment Day
 Farewell

Campus 
The campus is spread over 4 acres & is located on national highway no 71, 10 km from Barnala city.

See also 
Education in India
Education in Punjab, India
List of schools in India
 CBSE

References

External links 
 Official website
 Official Facebook Page

2012 establishments in Delhi
Educational institutions established in 2012